Cayoosh, derived from Spanish caballo like cayuse, is a placename in British Columbia, Canada.  It may refer to:

the basin of Cayoosh Creek, sometimes spelled Cayuse.  Also used in reference to Cayoosh Canyon, which is the lower valley of that creek.
the Cayoosh Range, aka "the high Cayoosh"
Cayoosh Flat, often only Cayoosh, the original name of the town of Lillooet, British Columbia
Cayoosh Mountain, a summit in the western Cayoosh Range near the Place Glacier
Cayoosh Falls, a now-inundated waterfall submerged by a private hydroelectric development on Cayoosh Creek
The name often figures in the names of local organizations and businesses:
the Cayuse Creek Indian Band (Sekwelwas First Nation); the spelling Kiy-oose is sometimes used in this context.
Cayoosh Elementary School in Lillooet
Cayoosh Heights, a neighbourhood of Lillooet
the Cayoosh ski area proposal (or Cayoosh Resort at Melvin Creek, a tributary of Cayoosh Creek
the Cayoosh Creek campground operated by BC Hydro at Seton Lake